Erland Johnsen (born 5 April 1967) is a Norwegian football manager and former professional footballer who is director of youth at Sarpsborg 08 FF.

As a player he was a centre back from 1983 until 1999, notably in the Premier League for Chelsea and in the Bundesliga for Bayern Munich. He also played for Moss, Rosenborg and Strømsgodset and earned 24 caps for Norway.

He moved into management in 1999 with Strømsgodset and later with Moss, Follo, Lillestrøm and Strømmen.

Club career
His playing career began in Moss, and he later joined Bayern Munich as a professional. During his two seasons at the club he was involved in two championships in 1989 and 1990.

In December 1989, he transferred to English team Chelsea, where he played for eight seasons and was voted player of the year for the club in 1995. He scored his only goal for the club against Southampton in April 1994. Whilst at Chelsea he played in the 1994 FA Cup Final. Chelsea won the 1996–97 FA Cup; in the fifth round against Leicester City FC at Stamford Bridge, Johnsen went down in the penalty area in the final minutes of extra time and referee Mike Reed awarded a penalty to Chelsea. The penalty was converted by Frank Leboeuf and secured a 1–0 win for Chelsea. It was considered by The Guardian's Scott Murray as one of the six worst referee decisions ever. Johnsen was left out of the squad for the final but played in the semi-final against Wimbledon. Shortly after this he returned to his native Norway where he played for Rosenborg and finally Strømsgodset before retiring in June 1999.

International career
Johnsen was a central defender who was capped 19 times for the Norwegian national team, participating in the 1994 World Cup. He also won five caps during Norway's unsuccessful qualification campaign for 1988 Olympics, although these are not recognized as full internationals by FIFA. He made 16 under-21 appearances for Norway. Perhaps the most famous moment in Johnsen's career came on 15 November 1989, during a match between Norway and Scotland, at Hampden Park, where he scored a goal from the middle of the pitch. The goal went around the world, even making CNN's "Play of the Day". It also caught the interest of Chelsea who purchased Johnsen later that same year. Legendary Scottish goalkeeper Jim Leighton said about the shot twenty years later: "I'm never allowed to forget about it in Scotland, it is the furthest I've ever lost a goal from." Johnsen reconstructed the goal together with Leighton in 2009 on the Norwegian sports entertainment show Golden Goal.

Managerial career
Johnsen remained with Strømsgodset as an assistant coach for the next three years after he retired as a footballer. Later he had spells with Moss (2002–2003) and Follo (2003–2006). He also worked for Lillestrøm as a player developer.

After Tom Nordlie resigned on 29 May 2008, Johnsen stepped in as caretaker, together with former Chelsea teammate Frode Grodås.

In January 2012, he agreed to coach Strømmen.

Ahead of the 2019 season he became youth director of Sarpsborg 08 FF.

Honours
Moss
Tippeligaen: 1987

Bayern Munich
Bundesliga: 1988–89, 1989–90

Chelsea
FA Cup: 1996–97; Runner up: 1993–94
Full Members Cup: 1989–90

Rosenborg
Tippeligaen: 1997, 1998

Individual
Chelsea Player of the Year: 1994–95

Statistics

Club

1Includes four 1989–90 Full Members Cup games.

International

International goals

References

External links

Premier League profile

1967 births
Living people
Sportspeople from Fredrikstad
Norwegian footballers
Norway international footballers
Norwegian football managers
Moss FK players
FC Bayern Munich footballers
Chelsea F.C. players
Rosenborg BK players
Strømsgodset Toppfotball players
Eliteserien players
Bundesliga players
Premier League players
English Football League players
1994 FIFA World Cup players
Norwegian expatriate footballers
Expatriate footballers in Germany
Expatriate footballers in England
Moss FK managers
Lillestrøm SK managers
Association football defenders
Strømmen IF managers
Sarpsborg 08 FF non-playing staff
FA Cup Final players